This is a list of the lower court decisions of Lord Sankey.

1914-1916

1917-1919

1920-1922

1923-1925

1926-1928

1929-1930

See also
John Sankey, 1st Viscount Sankey
Lord Sankey's JCPC judgments
List of Judicial Committee of the Privy Council cases
List of Judicial Committee of the Privy Council cases originating in Canada

Legal history of England
Lower court decisions by Lord Sankey